Anara is a Town in the Para CD block in the Raghunathpur subdivision of the Purulia district, West Bengal, India, about 14 km from Adra Junction. Anara Railway Station is having 2 platforms for up trains and down trains. Anara has large number of Railway employees mostly Running  staff residing in 3 pockets viz. Bungalow side, Old colony and new colony apart from the market area. There is a big railway school and adjacent to it a play ground.

Geography

Area overview
Purulia district forms the lowest step of the Chota Nagpur Plateau. The general scenario is undulating land with scattered hills. Raghunathpur subdivision occupies the northern part of the district. 83.80% of the population of the subdivision lives in rural areas. However, there are pockets of urbanization and 16.20% of the population lives in urban areas. There are 14 census towns in the subdivision. It is presented in the map given alongside. There is a coal mining area around Parbelia and two thermal power plants are there – the 500 MW Santaldih Thermal Power Station and the 1200 MW Raghunathpur Thermal Power Station. The subdivision has a rich heritage of old temples, some of them belonging to the 11th century or earlier. The Banda Deul is a monument of national importance. The comparatively more recent in historical terms, Panchkot Raj has interesting and intriguing remains in the area.

Note: The map alongside presents some of the notable locations in the subdivision. All places marked in the map are linked in the larger full screen map.

Demographics
According to the 2011 Census of India, Anara had a total population of 5,517, of which 2,822 (51%) were males and 2695 (49%) were females. There were 679 persons in the age range of 0–6 years. The total number of literate persons in Anara was 2,964 (61.26& of the population over 6 years).

Transport
Anara is off State Highway 5 running from Rupnarayanpur (in Bardhaman district) to Junput (in Purba Medinipur district).

There is a station at Anara on the Adra-Purulia sector of the Asansol-Tatanagar-Kharagpur line of the South Eastern Railway. South Bihar Express and Swarnarekha express are two major trains that stops here .

Education
Raghunathpur College was established in 1961 at Raghunathpur.

Anara South Eastern Railway Colony High School is a Bengali-medium boys only institution established in 1957. It has facilities for teaching from class V to class XII.

Anara Girls High School is a Bengali-medium girls only institution established in 1962. It has facilities for teaching from class V to class XII.

Culture
Banda Deul, located nearby, an 11th-century temple, is a monument of national importance.

There are 3 dilapidated deulas at Para belonging to the 10th-11th century.

References

Villages in Purulia district